The Depretis VIII government of Italy held office from 4 April 1887 until 29 July 1887, a total of 116 days, or 3 months and 25 days.

Government parties
The government was composed by the following parties:

Composition

References

Italian governments
1887 establishments in Italy
1887 disestablishments in Italy